Moaf or Maaf may refer to:
 Maaf Vaziri, Sowme'eh Sara County
 Moaf, Bandar-e Anzali
 Moaf, Masal

See also
 MAAF (disambiguation)